The 1984–85 Hong Kong First Division League season was the 74th since its establishment.

League table

References
1984–85 Hong Kong First Division table (RSSSF)

Hong
Hong Kong First Division League seasons
1984–85 in Hong Kong football